First-seeded Nancye Bolton defeated Thelma Long 6–1, 7–5 in the final to win the women's singles tennis title at the 1951 Australian Championships.

Seeds
The seeded players are listed below. Nancye Bolton is the champion; others show the round in which they were eliminated.

 Nancye Bolton (champion)
 Joyce Fitch (semifinals)
 Thelma Long (finalist)
 Mary Hawton (quarterfinals)
 Esme Ashford (semifinals)
 Nell Hopman (quarterfinals)
 Sadie Newcombe (second round)
 Beryl Penrose (quarterfinals)

Draw

Key
 Q = Qualifier
 WC = Wild card
 LL = Lucky loser
 r = Retired

Finals

Earlier rounds

Section 1

Section 2

External links
 archived results of the Australian Open homepage

1951 in women's tennis
1951
1951 in Australian tennis
1951 in Australian women's sport